Edwyn Seymour Reid Tait (1885 – 6 November 1960) was a draper and antiquarian who specialised in the folklore of the Shetland Islands. His collection of books, newspaper clippings and other material relating to the islands are held at the Shetland Museum and Archives.

Selected publications
Statistical account of Shetland, 1791-1799, drawn up from the communications of the ministers of the different parishes by Sir John Sinclair. [Extracts from The statistical account of Scotland.]   1925  
Hjaltland Miscellany vols 1–5, compiled and edited, sometimes with Christina Jamieson, 1934 etc.   
Pioneers of the temperance movement in Lerwick: being an address delivered by E.S.R. Tait at the celebration of the 25th anniversary of the opening of the Rechabite Hall, Lerwick, April 5, 1922, 1923
Shetland Folk Book Vol. 1, co-edited with Thomas A. Robertson and John J. Graham,  Shetland Folk Society 1947 
Two translations from the Dano-Norwegian: I. About contacts between the Orkneys and Shetland and the Motherland Norway after 1468 (Dr. Daae's treatise). II. The letters of Jakob Jakobsen, D.Ph., to Gilbert Goudie, F.S.A. Scot. 1953
Lerwick Miscellany, 1955

References

External links

1885 births
1960 deaths
20th-century Scottish historians
Scottish folklorists
Royal Navy officers of World War I
Shetland writers